Maria Anzai (安西 マリア, Anzai Maria, b. Mariko Shibasaki on December 16, 1953 - d. March 15, 2014) was a Japanese idol.

Biography 

Maria Anzai made her debut in 1973 with a Japanese language version of "Namida no Taiyō", originally performed in English by Japanese singer Emy Jackson. The single sold over 500,000 copies. That same year she was nominated for Best Newcomer of the Year at the 15th Japan Record Awards, but was beaten by Junko Sakurada. She has also acted in movies and television series.

She retired from show business in 1978, married and emigrated to Hawaii. She released 12 singles between 1973 and 1978 and 4 albums.

She made a comeback in 2000.

Maria Anzai died on March 15, 2014.

See also 

 Kayōkyoku
 Japanese idol
 List of Japanese idols

References

External links 

1953 births
Japanese women singers
Japanese idols
2014 deaths
Japanese film actresses